The following are international rankings of Lebanon.

Demographics

United Nations: Population, ranked 124 out of 223 countries
CIA World Factbook: Urbanization ranked 21 out of 193 countries

Economy
 The Wall Street Journal and Heritage Foundation: Index of Economic Freedom 2018, ranked 95 out of 179 countries
World Bank: Ease of Doing Business Index 2015, ranked 99 out of 181 countries
International Monetary Fund: GDP per capita 2017, ranked 51 out of 179 countries 
World Bank: GDP per capita 2016, ranked 47 out of 170 countries 
CIA World Factbook: GDP per capita 2013, ranked 67 out of 192 countries 

In the 2009 quality of life index, Lebanon ranked in the last place ( out of 194 countries ) 

Lebanon ranked in the 35th largest exporter of IT ICT enabled services among 173 countries

Education

Listed by the World Economic Forum's 2013 Global Information Technology Report, Lebanon has been ranked globally as the fourth best country for math and science education, and as the tenth best overall for quality of education.
In Quality of management schools, the country was ranked 131st worldwide. These rankings are based on the Executive Opinion Survey, carried out as part of the WEF's Global Competitiveness Report, based on polling a sample of business leaders in each respective country.

United Nations gross enrolment ratio 2005, ranked 47 out of 177 countries
United Nations Development Programme: literacy rate 2007/2008, ranked 96 out of 177 countries

Geography

Total area ranked 166 out of 233 countries and outlying territories
Renewable water resources ranked 145 out of 174 countries

Military

CIA World Factbook: Military expenditures ranked 78 out of 171 countries
CIA World Factbook: Military expenditures ratio to GDP, ranked 45 out of 174 countries

Politics

Transparency International:  Corruption Perceptions Index 2007, ranked 99 out of 179 countries
Reporters Without Borders: Worldwide Press Freedom Index 2008, ranked 66 out of 173 countries
The Economist EIU: Democracy Index 2008, ranked 89 out of 167 countries

Tourism

Growth in tourism for 2009, Lebanon came first out of 165 countries examined by ( UNWTO ) with an increase of 60% from 2008.

Transportation

Motor vehicles per capita ranked 23 out of 140 countries

References

Lebanon